Jackson Township is an inactive township in Dallas County, in the U.S. state of Missouri.

Jackson Township was founded in 1841, taking its name from President Andrew Jackson.

References

Townships in Missouri
Townships in Dallas County, Missouri